Galleh Dari Mohammad Nuratbayi (also Romanized as Galleh Dāri Moḩammad Nūrāţbāyī) is a village in Tang-e Narak Rural District, in the Central District of Khonj County, Fars Province, Iran. At the 2006 census, its population was 24, in 5 families.

References 

Populated places in Khonj County